The 2019–20 UConn Huskies women's basketball team represented the University of Connecticut (UConn) during the 2019–20 NCAA Division I women's basketball season. The Huskies, led by Hall of Fame head coach Geno Auriemma in his 35th season at UConn, split their home games between Harry A. Gampel Pavilion and the XL Center and were in their seventh and final season as members of the American Athletic Conference (The American).

UConn had a record of 26–3 during the regular season. They went 16–0 in the AAC and were the conference regular season champions. Then, they won the AAC tournament. UConn received an automatic bid to the 2020 NCAA Division I women's basketball tournament, but the tournament was cancelled due to the COVID-19 pandemic. The team finished the season ranked number 5 in the AP poll.

The Huskies left The American to join several of their former conference mates in the Big East Conference in July 2020.

Media
Every UConn women's game was televised. Excluding exhibitions, most Huskies games aired on SNY, an ESPN network, or a CBS network. Exhibition games and games that aired on SNY were also streamed on Husky Vision. Every game was broadcast on the UConn IMG Sports Network with an extra audio broadcast available online to listen to through Husky Vision.

Off-season

Departures

Incoming transfers

Recruits

Roster

Schedule

|-
!colspan=12 style=""| Exhibition

|-
!colspan=12 style=""| Regular season

|-
!colspan=12 style=|AAC Tournament

Rankings

^ Coaches did not release a Week 2 poll

See also
2019–20 UConn Huskies men's basketball team

References

UConn Huskies women's basketball seasons
Connecticut
Connect
Connect